Biduiyeh-ye Yek (also Romanized as Bīdū’īyeh-e Yek; also known as Bīdū’īyeh and Bīdūyeh) is a village in Derakhtengan Rural District, in the Central District of Kerman County, Kerman Province, Iran. At the 2006 census, its population was 44, in 17 families.

References 

Populated places in Kerman County